Workington bus station is a bus station in Workington, England. It was opened on 19 March 1926 by Cumberland Motor Services as the first purpose-built covered bus station in Great Britain. In March 2006, a request from the Workington and District Civic Trust to have the building listed was turned down as it was deemed to have had too many modifications. In October 2006, a plaque was added to the exterior of the building to commemorate its history. In 2019, the bus station was redecorated and paintings from local schoolchildren were installed on its interior walls.

References

Bus stations in England
1926 establishments in England
Workington